is a Pokémon species in Nintendo and Game Freak's Pokémon franchise. Created by Ken Sugimori, Lapras first appeared in the video games Pokémon Red and Blue and subsequent sequels, later appearing in various merchandise, spinoff titles and animated and printed adaptations of the franchise. Lapras is a water-type large Pokémon that resembles a plesiosaur. Lapras was voiced by Rikako Aikawa in both the Japanese and English-language versions of the anime.

Concept and characteristics
Lapras was one of 151 different designs conceived by Game Freak's character development team and finalized by Ken Sugimori for the first generation of Pocket Monsters games Red and Green, which were localized outside Japan as Pokémon Red and Blue. Its English name is a romanization of the Japanese name Rapurasu, subsequently revealed to be the Japanese way of writing Laplace,  a name likely based after the mathematician Pierre-Simon Laplace. In the Pokémon Red and Blue beta version, Lapras was named "Ness".

Lapras, known as the Transport Pokémon, is a large sea creature which resembles a plesiosaur. It may also be inspired by placodonts. It has four flippers, however its front ones are notably larger than its hind flippers. It has a long neck, and large black eyes. Lapras has unusual curled ears and a short horn in the middle of its forehead. The majority of its body is blue, while its underside is a light cream-yellow color. Its most distinguishing feature is the gray shell on its back, which is largely dotted with blunt knobs. Lapras is most known for its fondness of moving people and Pokémon across bodies of water. Some Lapras are able to develop Psychic abilities such as telepathy, which makes them able to understand human speech. They keep track of their fellow pod members through use of high-pitched songs they constantly sing, much like whales. Unfortunately due to their docile nature they do not like to fight, and this has made them an easy target for hunters, which has made them very rare in the wild, due to being over hunted.

In Pokémon Sword and Shield, Lapras received a Gigantamax form with access to the unique G-Max Move G-Max Resonance, the only Ice-type G-Max Move.

Appearances

In the video games
Lapras first appears in Pokémon Red and Blue, and appearing in other Pokémon games such as Pokémon Yellow, Pokémon Stadium, Pokémon Gold and Silver, Pokémon Crystal, Pokémon Stadium 2, Pokémon Ruby and Sapphire, Pokémon FireRed and LeafGreen, Pokémon Emerald, Pokémon Diamond and Pearl, Pokémon Platinum, Pokémon HeartGold and SoulSilver, Pokémon Black and White, Pokémon Black 2 and White 2, Pokémon X and Y, Pokémon Omega Ruby and Alpha Sapphire, Pokémon Sun and Moon, Pokémon Ultra Sun and Ultra Moon, Pokémon: Let's Go, Pikachu! and Let's Go, Eevee! and Pokémon Sword and Shield.

Outside of the main series, Lapras appears in Pokémon Snap, Pokémon Pinball, Pokémon Channel, Pokémon Trozei!, Pokémon Mystery Dungeon: Blue Rescue Team and Red Rescue Team, Pokémon Ranger, Pokémon Mystery Dungeon: Explorers of Time and Explorers of Darkness, Pokémon Mystery Dungeon: Explorers of Sky, Pokémon Ranger: Shadows of Almia, Pokémon Rumble, PokéPark Wii: Pikachu's Adventure, Pokémon Rumble Blast, PokéPark 2: Wonders Beyond, Pokémon Conquest, Pokémon Rumble U, Pokémon Battle Trozei, Pokémon Shuffle, Pokémon Rumble World, Pokémon Picross, Detective Pikachu, Pokémon Rumble Rush, Pokémon Mystery Dungeon: Rescue Team DX, Pokémon Go and New Pokémon Snap. It also appears in the crossover game Super Smash Bros. Ultimate, under the form of a spirit which can be ridden to cross water bodies within the "World of Light".

In other media
In the anime, Ash travels to the Orange Islands and finds a young Lapras which has been accidentally left behind by its pod. It joins him after he rescues it from three abusive trainers and Team Rocket. It is mainly used for transportation between the various islands, but he uses it in some battles. Lapras eventually reunites with its pod and leaves Ash. They meet up again in Johto where Lapras rescues its entire pod from Team Rocket and becomes their leader. Lapras also appears in the second part of the anime special Pokémon Mystery Dungeon: Explorers of Time & Darkness where she takes Piplup and Chimchar on a ride. In the Pokémon Adventures manga, Pryce lost two of his favorite Lapras in an avalanche, just as the egg born by them hatched. Unable to get over his loss, Pryce swore to save his Lapras and thus began researching into time travel, setting the events of the Johto saga in motion in which he tries to capture a Celebi in a GS Ball. In The Electric Tale of Pikachu, Ash catches a Lapras and uses it for transport through the Orange Islands saga.

Reception
IGN's Pokémon Chick wrote that Lapras was "amazing" and has "won the heart of many a trainer, including yours truly" due to its "great beauty, grace and gentleness". UGO Networks' Chris Plante named Lapras one of the "most unconventional vehicles in games". GamesRadar's Raymond Padilla wrote that it is "one of our favorite Pokémon from the original game". Author Loredana Lipperini wrote that Lapras was "reliable", "placid", and "gentle". Lapras has been compared to several creatures both real and mythological. IGN wrote that it was "loosely based on a plesiosaur, crossed with a tortoise". Gamershell's David Jenkins compared Lapras to the Loch Ness Monster. Author Ash Dekirk described it as a combination of a sea turtle and a dragon. He also described it as resembling a plesiosaur with a spiky tortoise shell on its back. Official Nintendo Magazines Thomas East compared it to a plesiosaur as well as Loosha from Professor Layton and the Last Specter. Game Revolution's Johnny Liu described it as a "subservient Loch Ness monster". IGN named it the 27th best Pokémon. Game Informer also included it in its list of Pokémon at #29. Official Nintendo Magazines readers voted it the eighth best Water-type Pokémon. Lapras was ranked 23rd in Complexs "The 50 Best Pokemon Up to Pokemon Crystal", with Elijah Watson saying "Lapras is still an incredible Pokemon." Steven Bogos of The Escapist listed Lapras as his favorite Pokémon, stating that based on the infamous Loch Ness Monster, it also has a pretty sweet design. Lyra Hale of The Mary Sue claimed that "it got absolutely wild Lapras was a swan boat ride."

In the Pokémon of the Year poll held by The Pokémon Company, Lapras was voted the tenth most popular Generation I Pokémon, receiving 23,411 votes. A Lapras-themed parfait was launched at the Pokémon Café in Tokyo in 2018. In 2019, Miyagi Prefecture in the Tōhoku region of Japan selected Lapras as its "official Pokémon" as a tourism ambassador. Lapras was later used on Pokémon Go to revive tourism near the coast of Iwate Prefecture, Miyagi Prefecture and Fukushima Prefecture after the impact of 2011 Tōhoku earthquake and tsunami. A mascot of Lapras has already appeared Miyagi as part of new tourism ambassador role. In 2020, people can now travel with Lapras on Miyagi.

Lapras was a subject of the Pokémon Go Incident. In 2016, a man crashed his car after seeing a Lapras that he hadn’t encountered before and some Bosnian players wandering close to landmines after encountering Lapras. In 2017, a Singaporean player named Liang Weiming died from a heart attack after a capturing rare Lapras at Marina Bay Sands.

Merchandise
A variety of merchandise depicting Lapras have been produced such as the gigantic plush, float, hoody water bottle and tank top, stationery, T-shirt, and mascot.

References

External links

Lapras on Bulbapedia
Lapras on Pokemon.com

Pokémon species
Video game characters introduced in 1996
Video game characters with water abilities
Video game characters with ice or cold abilities
Loch Ness Monster in fiction
Fictional undersea characters
Fictional dinosaurs
Fictional monsters
Nintendo protagonists
Video game bosses
Fictional characters who can change size

es:Anexo:Pokémon de la primera generación#Lapras
fi:Luettelo Pokémon-lajeista (121–151)#Lapras